The 1999–2000 Superliga Espanola de Hockey Hielo season was the 26th season of the Superliga Espanola de Hockey Hielo, the top level of ice hockey in Spain. Six teams participated in the league, and CH Txuri Urdin won the championship.

Standings

Playoffs

Semifinal
 CH Majadahonda – CH Jaca 6:8, 5:6
 CH Txuri Urdin – CG Puigcerdà 8:6, 3:4

Final
 CH Txuri Urdin – CH Jaca 4:3, 1:5, 4:3

External links
Season on hockeyarchives.info

Liga Nacional de Hockey Hielo seasons
Spa
Liga